Stephen Friedman may refer to:

Stephen Friedman (PFIAB) (born 1937), former chairman of the United States President's Foreign Intelligence Advisory Board
Stephen J. Friedman (academic administrator) (born 1938), former commissioner of the United States Securities and Exchange Commission, and president of Pace University
Stephen J. Friedman (producer) (1937–1996), American film producer

See also
Steven Freeman (disambiguation)
Steven Friedman (born 1953), South African academic and newspaper columnist
Friedman